Gruhalakshmi is a 1967 Telugu-language, comedy film, produced and directed by P. S. Ramakrishna Rao under the Bharani Pictures banner. It stars P. Bhanumathi and Akkineni Nageswara Rao with music composed by S. Rajeswara Rao. The film was remade as the Tamil movie Anbe Aaruyire (1975).

Plot
The film begins on Srinivasa Rao / Chitti (Akkineni Nageswara Rao) a law student his father Bhagavatam (S. V. Ranga Rao) is an orthodox & superstitious person. Chitti marries a noble & ideal lady Lakshmi (Bhanumathi Ramakrishna) who takes care of her in-laws' and family meticulously. Here, Bhagavatam does not permit the couple to stay together as it's Chitti's exam time. Distressed Chitti plans to celebrate his honeymoon, with the help of brother-in-law Vaali (Padmanabham) and gives a fake telegram that Lakshmi's mother is ill. Right now, Chitti to return b keeps Lakshmi in a small hotel in a remote area. Thereafter, Vaali too returns to his hometown to avoid his parents knowing the truth. In the hotel, Lakshmi & Chitti faces many unforeseen incidents. Moreover, the hotel manager (Ramana Reddy) & other mates suspect them as an eloped couple. On the double, Chitti loses his purse while escaping from his father's assistant. At the same time, to their misfortune, Vaali meets with an accident and brought to the city when their drama breaks out. Parallelly, Chitti is not able to pay the hotel bill, so, they somehow escape and reach home where Chitti is surprised to see his in-laws. At present, Bhagavatam starts chiding Chitti when his wife (Suryakantham) mentions that all these incidents are because of his strict discipline. At last, Bhagavatam realizes his mistake and allow the couple to be united. Finally, the movie ends on a happy note.

Cast
P. Bhanumathi as Lakshmi
Akkineni Nageswara Rao as Srinivasa Rao / Chitti
S. V. Ranga Rao as Bhagavatam
Ramana Reddy as Hotel Manager
Padmanabham as Vaali
Allu Ramalingaiah as Mate of Hotel
Raja Babu as Mate of Hotel
Raavi Kondala Rao as Mate of Hotel
Balakrishna
Dr. Sivaramakrishnaiah as Doctor
Suryakantam as Bhagavatam's wife
Rushyendramani as Lakshmi's mother
Radha Kumari as Mate of Hotel

Crew
Art: Rajendra Kumar
Story — Dialogues: D. V. Narasa Raju 
Lyrics: Sri Sri, Samudrala, Dasaradhi, C. Narayana Reddy, Arudra, Kosaraju
Playback: Ghantasala, M. Balamuralikrishna Bhanumathi Ramakrishna, Madhavapeddi Satyam, P. Nageswara Rao
Music: S. Rajeswara Rao 
Editing: B. Hari Narayana
Cinematography: C. Nageswara Rao
Producer — Director: P. S. Ramakrishna Rao
Banner: Bharani Pictures
Release Date: 7 April 1967

Soundtrack

Music composed by S. Rajeswara Rao.

References

1960s Telugu-language films
Indian romantic comedy-drama films
Telugu films remade in other languages
Films scored by S. Rajeswara Rao